Methylobacterium brachiatum  is a Gram-negative, strictly aerobic, facultatively methylotrophic and non-spore-forming bacteria from the genus of Methylobacterium which has been isolated from water from food processing factories in Japan.

References

Further reading

External links
Type strain of Methylobacterium brachiatum at BacDive -  the Bacterial Diversity Metadatabase

Hyphomicrobiales
Bacteria described in 2008